José Alberto Godoy (born October 13, 1994) is a Venezuelan professional baseball catcher who is a free agent. He has previously played in Major League Baseball (MLB) for the Seattle Mariners, Minnesota Twins and Pittsburgh Pirates. He was signed by the St. Louis Cardinals as an international free agent in 2011. When he made his MLB debut on May 21, 2021, he became the 20,000th player in MLB history.

Career

St. Louis Cardinals
On July 2, 2011, Godoy signed with the St. Louis Cardinals as an international free agent. He made his professional debut with the DSL Cardinals in 2012. In 2013, he played for the GCL Cardinals, slashing .263/.368/.307 in 36 games.

Godoy split the 2014 season between the rookie ball Johnson City Cardinals and the High-A Palm Beach Cardinals, posting a batting line of .320/.411/.377 in 122 at-bats. He split 2015 between Palm Beach and the Low-A State College Spikes, batting .230/.331/.310. In 2016, he played tor the Single-A Peoria Chiefs and the Double-A Springfield Cardinals, hitting .295/.373/.344 with 1 home run and a career-high 31 RBI. He played 2017 in Palm Beach, slashing .265/.317/.374 with career-highs in home runs (4) and RBI (41). He split 2018 between Springfield and Palm Beach, hitting .281/.368/.360 in 77 games.

On November 19, 2018, Godoy re-signed with the Cardinals on a new minor league contract that included an invitation to Spring Training. He did not make the club and was assigned to Springfield. In 2019, Godoy reached Triple-A for the first time with the Memphis Redbirds, splitting the season between Memphis and Springfield, slashing .276/.354/.431 with 7 home runs and 42 RBI. He was invited to Spring Training for the 2020 season. Godoy did not play in a game in 2020 due to the cancellation of the minor league season because of the COVID-19 pandemic. He was added to the Cardinals 60-man player pool for the 2020 season but did not make an appearance for the club. On November 2, 2020, Godoy elected free agency.

Seattle Mariners
On November 20, 2020, Godoy signed a minor league contract with the Seattle Mariners organization. He was assigned to the Triple-A Tacoma Rainiers to begin the 2021 season. On May 20, 2021, Godoy was selected to the 40-man roster and promoted to the major leagues for the first time. Godoy made his MLB debut that night against the San Diego Padres as a replacement for fellow backstop Tom Murphy. Godoy also became the 20,000th player in MLB history. In his rookie campaign, Godoy appeared in 16 major league games, hitting .162/.225/.189 with 3 RBI.

Minneosta Twins
On March 13, 2022, Godoy was claimed off waivers by the San Francisco Giants. Godoy was subsequently waived by the Giants and claimed by the Minnesota Twins on March 17, 2022. He was designated for assignment on April 6, 2022. On April 10, Godoy was sent outright to the Triple-A St. Paul Saints. On April 23, the Twins promoted Godoy to the major leagues. On August 1, 2022, Godoy was designated for assignment.

Pittsburgh Pirates
On August 5, 2022, Godoy was claimed off waivers by the Pittsburgh Pirates. On August 20, 2022, Godoy was designated for assignment. After clearing waivers, he was outrighted to Triple-A Indianapolis on August 23. Godoy was once again designated for assignment on October 18. On October 27, Godoy elected free agency.

Los Angeles Angels
On December 31, 2022, Godoy signed a minor league deal with the Los Angeles Angels. He was released by the team prior to the start of the regular season on March 14, 2023.

References

External links

1994 births
Living people
Sportspeople from Maracaibo
Major League Baseball players from Venezuela
Venezuelan expatriate baseball players in the United States
Major League Baseball catchers
Seattle Mariners players
Minnesota Twins players
Pittsburgh Pirates players
Dominican Summer League Cardinals players
Venezuelan expatriate baseball players in the Dominican Republic
Gulf Coast Cardinals players
Johnson City Cardinals players
Palm Beach Cardinals players
State College Spikes players
Peoria Chiefs players
Springfield Cardinals players
Memphis Redbirds players
Tacoma Rainiers players
Caribes de Anzoátegui players
St. Paul Saints players